The Mark 22 torpedo, was an active acoustic homing torpedo developed by Bell Telephone Laboratories and Westinghouse Electric 1944. Development of this torpedo was discontinued at the end of World War II.

See also 
 Mark 21 torpedo, two acoustic homing torpedo projects, one developed by Bell Labs and one by Westinghouse.
 American 21 inch torpedo

References

Torpedoes
Torpedoes of the United States
Unmanned underwater vehicles